Alberta Provincial Highway No. 50 is a  east–west highway in central Alberta, Canada. It runs between the hamlets of Tees and Mirror, northeast of Red Deer.

Major intersections 
From west to east:

References 

050